The Communauté de communes du Pays de Seine is a former federation of municipalities (communauté de communes) in the Seine-et-Marne département and in the Île-de-France région of France. It was created in November 2002. It was dissolved in January 2017.

Composition 
The Communauté de communes comprised the following communes:
Bois-le-Roi
Chartrettes
Fontaine-le-Port
Samois-sur-Seine

See also
Communes of the Seine-et-Marne department

References 

Former commune communities of Seine-et-Marne